2022–23 Albanian Cup is the seventy-first season of Albania's annual cup competition, the Albanian Cup.

Format
Ties are played in a two-legged format similar to those of European competitions. If the aggregate score is tied after both games, the match is decided by extra time and a penalty shoot-out, if necessary.

Preliminary round
In order to reduce the number of participating teams for the First round to 32, a preliminary tournament is played. In contrast to the main tournament, the preliminary tournament is held as a single-leg knock-out competition. The matches were played on 15 September 2022.

|-

|}

Veleçiku advanced to the first round.

Devolli advanced to the first round.

First round
All 26 eligible teams of the 2022–23 Kategoria Superiore and 2022–23 Kategoria e Parë will enter in this round along with 8 teams from Kategoria e Dytë. The matches were played on 25, 26, 28 September 2022 as well as 11 and 12 October 2022.

|}

Tirana advanced to the second round.

Partizani advanced to the second round.

Vllaznia advanced to the second round.

Kastrioti advanced to the second round.

Dinamo Tirana advanced to the second round.

Bylis advanced to the second round.

Korabi advanced to the second round.

Lushnja advanced to the second round.

Laçi advanced to the second round.

Kukësi advanced to the second round.

Teuta advanced to the second round.

Egnatia advanced to the second round.

Skënderbeu advanced to the second round.

Erzeni advanced to the second round.

Apolonia advanced to the second round.

Tomori advanced to the second round.

Second round
All the 16 qualified teams from the First Round progressed to the Second Round. The first legs were played on 17 and 18 January 2023 while the second legs took place on 2 and 3 February 2023.

|}

Tirana advanced to the quarter finals.

Partizani advanced to the quarter finals.

Vllaznia advanced to the quarter finals.

Kastrioti advanced to the quarter finals.

Laçi advanced to the quarter finals.

Kukësi advanced to the quarter finals.

Teuta advanced to the quarter finals.

Egnatia advanced to the quarter finals.

Quarter-finals
All eight qualified teams from the second round progressed to the quarter-finals. The first legs were played on 28 February and 1 March 2023 while the second legs took place on 14 and 15 March 2023.

|}

Tirana advanced to the semi finals.

Vllaznia advanced to the semi finals.

Egnatia advanced to the semi finals.

Teuta advanced to the semi finals.

References

External links

Cup
Albanian Cup seasons
Albanian Cup